Joseph Tabbi (May 4, 1960) is a US literary scholar and theorist, notable for his contributions to the fields of American literature and electronic literature. He was the first scholar granted access to the archives of the reclusive novelist William Gaddis, and is the author of Nobody Grew but the Business: On the Life and Work of William Gaddis and the editor of The Bloomsbury Handbook of Electronic Literature (2017), Post-Digital: Critical Debates from electronic book review (2020), and an additional forthcoming volume from Bloomsbury Publishing. His other works include Cognitive Fictions (2002) and Postmodern Sublime: Technology and American Writing from Mailer to Cyberpunk (1996). He edits the scholarly journal Electronic Book Review (ebr), which he founded with Mark Amerika. Tabbi is also the founder of Consortium on Electronic Literature (CELL), an "open access, non-commercial resource offering centralized access to literary databases, archives, and institutional programs" in the humanities.

Biography
Tabbi received a Ph.D. from the University of Toronto in 1989 for a dissertation titled "The Psychology of Machines: Technology and Personal Identity in the Work of Norman Mailer and Thomas Pynchon."

Books 
Postmodern Sublime: Technology and American Writing from Mailer to Cyberpunk (Cornell University Press, 1996) 
Cognitive Fictions (University of Minnesota Press, 2002) 
Nobody Grew but the Business: On the Life and Work of William Gaddis (Northwestern University Press, 2015)

Edited books 
Reading Matters: Narrative in the New Media Ecology (Cornell University Press,1997) (with Michael Wutz) 
Paper Empire: William Gaddis and the World System (University of Alabama Press, 2007) (with Rone Shavers et al.) 
The Bloomsbury Handbook of Electronic Literature (2017)
Post-Digital: Critical Debates from electronic book review (2019)

References

External links
 Joseph Tabbi's faculty page at the University of Illinois at Chicago

Cornell University alumni
University of Illinois Chicago faculty
Academic journal editors
1960 births
Living people
American literary theorists